The Dijon–Vallorbe railway is a railway line in the Bourgogne-Franche-Comté region of France. It runs  from Dijon to Vallorbe, on the Franco-Swiss border.

References

External links 
 

Railway lines in Bourgogne-Franche-Comté
1500 V DC railway electrification
25 kV AC railway electrification